Charles McKay Wall (March 10, 1880 – April 18, 1955) was an American businessman, mobster, and political figure who was a rival of reputed mobsters Santo Trafficante Sr. and Santo Trafficante Jr. His parents were John Perry Wall and Matilda McKay, a former Tampa Mayor and daughter of a former Tampa Mayor.  Wall rapidly gained status within the criminal underworld from his early endeavors in the operation of several gambling, prostitution, and illegal numbers rackets. He was killed, beaten with a baseball bat, and his throat slit, on April 18, 1955. He is buried in Tampa's Oaklawn Cemetery .

Early life

Charles McKay Wall was born on March 10, 1880, in Tampa, Florida, to John Perry Wall, a local physician and former mayor of the city, and Matilta McKay, a member of the prominent McKay family. Due to the abuse he suffered at the hands of his stepmother, Wall developed mental health issues and eventually shot his stepmother, killing her. As a result, Wall was sent to military school, despite showing promise as a student. He was expelled from the school, due to visiting a brothel.

Crime boss of Ybor City

The young Charlie spent much of his formative years, frequenting the gambling dens of Tampa and, at some point, he took over the city's criminal and political underworld.

Wall ran Tampa from the Ybor City neighborhood and employed Italians, Cubans and Irish into his organization. His closest associate was Evaristo "Tito" Rubio, a Cuban mobster and co-owner of the El Dorado Club. Additionally, Wall was prominently involved in organized corruption of judges, politicians and other government officials, facing little opposition from the law or other criminals.

Turf wars and death

During the late 1920s, a turf war began between Wall and Ignacio Antinori. They fought each other, as well as the Trafficante's, for control of the numbers rackets in the Tampa area.

By the 1930s, Ignacio Antinori and Charlie Wall were in a bloody war for ten years, which would later be known as "Era of Blood". Eddie Virella, Rubio's former partner at the Lincoln Club, was gunned down on 31 January 1937, and Rubio himself was killed by a gunman while on the porch of his home on March 8, 1938. 

The feud between Wall and Antinori came to a head between factions of Antinori Gang, dissatisfied members of Chicago and St. Louis criminal outfits to whom Antinori was supplying narcotics, and Wall's organisation. On the morning of October 23, 1940, Antinori was shot dead at a local restaurant while sipping his morning coffee by two gunmen. Wall himself had seen an attempt on his life go awry earlier that spring, possibly by some members of Antinori's outfit or even by some in Antinori's ties to St. Louis mobster Thomas Buffa and/or Kansas City mobsters Nicolo Impostato, James DeSimone and Joseph Deluca.

Wall was murdered on April 18, 1955, possibly on orders from the Trafficante's.

In popular culture

The Ghosts of Ybor City: Charlie Wall film 

The account and rise and fall of Wall was depicted in the 2008 documentary film The Ghosts of Ybor: Charlie Wall which starred actors John A. Schakel as Wall, Gene Siudut as Joe Bedami, Chris Pardal as Johnny "Scarface" Rivera, and Rod Grant as the lead detective in the Wall murder investigation.

References

External links
Who Killed Charlie Wall? article written by Gary Mormino, Cigar City Magazine, posted 1/11/2011.
The Mob - A Drive-by History of Tampa's Most Notorious Wiseguys, by Scott Deitche for cltampa.com (Creative Loafing), 4/26/2001.

1880 births
1955 deaths
People from Tampa, Florida
American gangsters
Murdered American gangsters
Deaths by beating in the United States
Deaths by stabbing in the United States
People murdered in Florida
Male murder victims
American crime bosses
Prohibition-era gangsters
Depression-era gangsters
Florida local politicians
Florida Democrats